Kevin Snyder (born July 25, 1992) is a former American football linebacker. He played college football at Rutgers.

College career
Snyder played at the middle, weak-side, and strong-side linebacker positions for the Rutgers Scarlet Knights football team. In a four-year career, Snyder had 229 total tackles, 6½ sacks, one forced fumble, one fumble recovery and 10 pass defenses. He was also the team's back-up long snapper.

Snyder, a member of the Big Ten and Big East All-Academic teams during his playing career at Rutgers, majored in economics.

Professional career

Detroit Lions
After going undrafted in the 2015 NFL Draft, Snyder signed with the Detroit Lions on May 2, 2015. He broke his hand in the Lions' second preseason game against the Washington Redskins and was subsequently placed on injured reserve. He was released from the injured reserve list on October 13.

San Francisco 49ers
Snyder was signed to the San Francisco 49ers practice squad on November 24, 2015. He was waived on December 1.

New England Patriots
Snyder was signed to the New England Patriots practice squad on December 16, 2015. In the week leading up to the AFC Championship Game, Snyder was promoted to the Patriots' active 53-man roster. He was active for the game, but did not play any snaps.

On September 3, 2016, Snyder was waived/injured by the Patriots and was placed on injured reserve after clearing waivers. On September 8, 2016, Snyder was released by the Patriots with an injury settlement.

Denver Broncos
On December 15, 2016 Snyder was signed to the Broncos' practice squad. He signed a reserve/future contract with the Broncos on January 2, 2017.

On September 2, 2017, Snyder was waived by the Broncos. He was re-signed to the Broncos' practice squad on October 24, 2017. He was promoted to the active roster on October 28, 2017. He was waived on November 7, 2017.

Arizona Cardinals
On November 27, 2017, Snyder was signed to the Arizona Cardinals' practice squad. He was released on December 19, 2017.

References

External links
New England Patriots profile
Rutgers Scarlet Knights profile

Living people
1992 births
People from Mechanicsburg, Pennsylvania
Rutgers University alumni
Rutgers Scarlet Knights football players
Players of American football from Pennsylvania
American football linebackers
Detroit Lions players
San Francisco 49ers players
New England Patriots players
Denver Broncos players
Arizona Cardinals players